Quantum: The Magazine of Math and Science was a United States-based bimonthly magazine of mathematics and science, primarily physics, designed for young readers. It was published by the National Science Teachers Association (NSTA) and Springer-Verlag and was headquartered in Washington DC.

Quantum was a sister publication of the Russian magazine Kvant. Quantum contained translations from Kvant and original material.

The magazine was founded in 1990. It ceased publication with its July/August 2001 issue.

Two books derived from Quantum materials have been published: Quantoons and Quantum Quandaries.

All articles from the magazine are indexed online by the NSTA.

References

External links
 WorldCat info

Student magazines published in the United States
Bimonthly magazines published in the United States
Defunct magazines published in the United States
Education magazines
Magazines established in 1990
Magazines disestablished in 2001
Science education in the United States
Magazines published in Washington, D.C.